Lycophron or Lycophro may refer to:

 Lycophron, Hellenistic tragic poet and possible author of the poem Alexandra or Cassandra
 Lycophron of Corinth, son of Periander, the seventh-century BC tyrant of Corinth
 Lycophron (Sophist), a sophist mentioned by Aristotle
 Lycophron I of Pherae, establisher of the tyranny of Pherae, to which his son Jason of Pherae succeeded
 Lycophron II of Pherae, cousin or nephew of Jason of Pherae, and possible joint tyrant with his brother Tisiphonus: see Rise of Macedon
Lycophron (mythology), an Achaean warrior during the Trojan War.